John Malcolm Forbes Ludlow  (8 March 1821 – 17 October 1911) was an Anglo-Indian barrister. He led the Christian socialist movement and founded its newspaper of the same name.

Biography
He was born in Nimach, British India, where his father worked for the East India Company. He was educated at Merchant Taylors' School, and called to the bar in 1843. Ludlow was influenced by French socialism as he was educated in Paris.

In 1850, he founded and became editor of The Christian Socialist newspaper. He was also a co-founder of the Working Men's College. Most of his work focused on mission work to the poor in London. He promoted mutual cooperation via friendly societies. He was secretary to the royal commission on friendly societies from 1870 to 1874, and served as England's chief registrar of friendly societies from 1875 to 1891. He was one of the first members and subsequently president of the Labour Co-Partnership Association. In 1867 Ludlow co-wrote The Progress of the Working Class, 1832–1867 with Lloyd Jones. He died in London in 1911.

Deaconesses
Ludlow also advocated a higher place for deaconesses in the church, in his publication Woman's Work in the Church: Historical Notes on Deaconesses and Sisterhoods (1865).

He was appointed a CB in the 1887 Golden Jubilee Honours.

References

1821 births
1911 deaths
Anglican socialists
Anglican writers
Companions of the Order of the Bath
English Anglicans
English barristers
English Christian socialists
English male journalists
English male non-fiction writers
English newspaper editors
People educated at Merchant Taylors' School, Northwood
19th-century English lawyers